H. Joseph Hepford (July 1, 1924 – March 22, 2010) is a former Republican member of the Pennsylvania House of Representatives.

References

Republican Party members of the Pennsylvania House of Representatives
1924 births
2010 deaths